The 2002 WNBA season was the 3rd season for the Indiana Fever. The team, led by Tamika Catchings, went to the playoffs for the first time in team history, losing in the first round to the New York Liberty.

Offseason

WNBA Draft

Regular season

Season standings

Season schedule

Player stats

References

Indiana Fever seasons
Indiana
Indiana Fever